The 2019 NCAA Division II football rankings are from the AFCA Coaches and from D2Football.com. This is for the 2019 season.

Legend

AFCA Coaches poll

D2Football.com poll

References

Rankings
NCAA Division II football rankings